Twice in a Lifetime is a Canadian mystery/drama series that originally aired from 1999 to 2001. Created by Steve Sohmer, the series aired on CTV in Canada and PAX in the United States.

Plot
The series follows an aspiring angel who for some reason, will not enter heaven, but is assigned to guide someone who has died prematurely. The prematurely deceased, played by the episode guest stars, may choose from the afterlife to correct something that went wrong earlier in their life. The key concept to the series was that each episode featured a different guest star in the leading role, while the series regulars played a supporting role.

Episodes are centered on an individual who had reached the end of their life in one timeline, and due to circumstances seen by their advocate and judge, is then given 3 days to travel into their past, and without revealing their true identity, convince their younger self to make a different choice at a pivotal point to effect a different outcome for example, by quitting smoking, or choosing a different job and in changing this learn a key lesson to make them become a better person. This way, the series was an anthology of many different arenas and characters.

Season One featured Gordie Brown as advocate Mr. Jones, and Paul Popowich played the role of advocate Mr. Smith in Season Two. Al Waxman played Judge Othniel in 40 of the 44 episodes. In Season One he appeared as Judge Jephtah in two episodes and Polly Bergen played Judge Deborah in two episodes. Waxman died in heart surgery on January 18, 2001, while the second season was airing.

Cast

Main
 Al Waxman: Judge Othniel/Judge Jepthah
 Gordie Brown: Mr. Jones (season 1)
 Paul Popowich: Mr. Smith (season 2)

Recurring
 Polly Bergen: Judge Deborah (season 1)
 Diahann Carroll: Jael, a lawyer (season 1)

Production

Crew
Ten episodes were directed by sci-fi veteran David Winning; including "The Trouble with Harry" (Jere Burns, Brent Carver), "Moonshine Over Harlem" (Earle Hyman) and "It's a Hard Knock Life" (Markie Post). Veteran television producer Barney Rosenzweig (Charlie's Angels, Cagney & Lacey) oversaw the first season of the series.

Writing
 The scenario of this series always takes place in four stages: the accidental death of a person, their judgment, their second chance in the past and the happy ending.
 In season 2, Mr. Jones is replaced by Mr. Smith, a mystery man with no ID pulled out of a burning church by a firefighter (season 2 episode 1: Fallen Angel) He dies in the firefighter's arms. His death seems to make him lose his memory. Jones is as much an expert as Smith is a clumsy beginner. Note that in the second season, the passage to the afterlife is different from season 1. Also Mr Smith seems to be trying to remember who he is and complete his job as a guide/defense and helper to the souls he picks up so he can either get his life back or become an angel. It's never made clear and we never find out what his whole story is. 
 In two episodes of the first season, we see the judge Deborah, played by Polly Bergen, and Diahann Carroll playing the role of prosecutor.

Episodes

Season 1: 1999–2000

Season 2: 2000–2001

Reception

Awards

Syndication
Reruns of Twice in a Lifetime are currently airing on the W Network in Canada and Ebru in the United States.

Home media
Video Service Corp has released two volumes of Twice in a Lifetime on DVD, with each volume featuring two episodes.

In February 2022, Visual Entertainment released the complete series on DVD in Region 1.

References

External links

1999 Canadian television series debuts
2001 Canadian television series endings
1990s Canadian drama television series
2000s Canadian drama television series
Angels in television
Canadian fantasy television series
CTV Television Network original programming
Canadian time travel television series
Television shows filmed in Toronto
Television series by Muse Entertainment
Religious drama television series
1990s Canadian time travel television series
2000s Canadian time travel television series